Mount Morse is a mountain rising to over  at the end of the ridge extending west from Mount Egerton, in the Churchill Mountains of Antarctica. Mount Morse was named by the Advisory Committee on Antarctic Names after Robert M. Morse of the Department of Physics, University of Wisconsin, a United States Antarctic Program principal investigator from 1989 to 2002, including research relating to the Antarctic Muon And Neutrino Detector Array near South Pole Station.

References

Mountains of Oates Land